Senator Farmer may refer to:

Gary Farmer (Florida politician) (born 1964), Florida State Senate
John Q. Farmer (1823–1904), Minnesota State Senate
William M. Farmer (1853–1931), Illinois State Senate